Francisco "Paco" Esteban Granado (born 21 August 1981 in Granada, Andalusia) is a Spanish retired footballer who played as a forward.

External links

1981 births
Living people
Footballers from Granada
Spanish footballers
Association football forwards
La Liga players
Segunda División players
Segunda División B players
Divisiones Regionales de Fútbol players
Club Recreativo Granada players
Granada CF footballers
Atlético Malagueño players
Málaga CF players
Ciudad de Murcia footballers
Polideportivo Ejido footballers
Granada 74 CF footballers
Girona FC players
Elche CF players
Ontinyent CF players
CD Alcoyano footballers